Mohamed Mansaray (born 25 December 1974) is a Sierra Leonean footballer. He played in 15 matches for the Sierra Leone national football team from 1993 to 2000. He was also named in Sierra Leone's squad for the 1994 African Cup of Nations tournament.

References

1974 births
Living people
Sierra Leonean footballers
Sierra Leone international footballers
1994 African Cup of Nations players
Place of birth missing (living people)
Association football defenders